Salimo Velonjara (born 11 October 1988) is a Comorian international footballer who plays for Fomboni, as a goalkeeper.

Career
Born in Antsiranana, Madagascar, he has played club football for Fomboni.

He made his international debut for Comoros in 2015.

References

1988 births
Living people
Comorian footballers
Comoros international footballers
Fomboni FC players
Association football goalkeepers